In mathematical analysis a pseudo-differential operator  is an extension of the concept of differential operator. Pseudo-differential operators are used extensively in the theory of partial differential equations and quantum field theory, e.g. in mathematical models that include ultrametric pseudo-differential equations in a non-Archimedean space.

History
The study of pseudo-differential operators began in the mid 1960s with the work of Kohn, Nirenberg, Hörmander, Unterberger and Bokobza.

They played an influential role in the second proof of the Atiyah–Singer index theorem via K-theory.  Atiyah and Singer thanked Hörmander for assistance with understanding the theory of pseudo-differential operators.

Motivation

Linear differential operators with constant coefficients
Consider a linear differential operator with constant coefficients,

which acts on smooth functions  with compact support in Rn.
This operator can be written as a composition of a Fourier transform, a simple multiplication by the
polynomial function (called the symbol)

and an inverse Fourier transform, in the form:

Here,  is a multi-index,  are complex numbers, and

is an iterated partial derivative, where ∂j means differentiation with respect to the j-th variable.  We introduce the constants  to facilitate the calculation of Fourier transforms.

Derivation of formula
The Fourier transform of a smooth function u, compactly supported in Rn, is

and Fourier's inversion formula gives

By applying P(D) to this representation of u and using

one obtains formula.

Representation of solutions to partial differential equations

To solve the partial differential equation

we (formally) apply the Fourier transform on both sides and obtain the algebraic equation

If the symbol P(ξ) is never zero when ξ ∈ Rn, then it is possible to divide by P(ξ):

By Fourier's inversion formula, a solution is

Here it is assumed that:
 P(D) is a linear differential operator with constant coefficients,
 its symbol P(ξ) is never zero,
 both u and ƒ have a well defined Fourier transform.
The last assumption can be weakened by using the theory of distributions.
The first two assumptions can be weakened as follows.

In the last formula, write out the Fourier transform of ƒ to obtain

This is similar to formula, except that 1/P(ξ) is not a polynomial function, but a function of a more general kind.

Definition of pseudo-differential operators

Here we view pseudo-differential operators as a generalization of differential operators.
We extend formula (1) as follows. A pseudo-differential operator P(x,D) on Rn is an operator whose value on the function u(x) is the function of x:

where  is the Fourier transform of u and the symbol P(x,ξ) in the integrand belongs to a certain symbol class.
For instance, if P(x,ξ) is an infinitely differentiable function on Rn × Rn with the property

for all x,ξ ∈Rn, all multiindices α,β, some constants Cα, β and some real number m, then P belongs to the symbol class  of Hörmander. The corresponding operator P(x,D) is called a pseudo-differential operator of order m and belongs to the class

Properties
Linear differential operators of order m with smooth bounded coefficients are pseudo-differential
operators of order m.
The composition PQ of two pseudo-differential operators P, Q is again a pseudo-differential operator and the symbol of PQ can be calculated by using the symbols of P and Q. The adjoint and transpose of a pseudo-differential operator is a pseudo-differential operator.

If a differential operator of order m is (uniformly) elliptic (of order m)
and invertible, then its inverse is a pseudo-differential operator of order −m, and its symbol can be calculated. This means that one can solve linear elliptic differential equations more or less explicitly
by using the theory of pseudo-differential operators.

Differential operators are local in the sense that one only needs the value of a function in a neighbourhood of a point to determine the effect of the operator. Pseudo-differential operators are pseudo-local, which means informally that when applied to a distribution they do not create a singularity at points where the distribution was already smooth.

Just as a differential operator can be expressed in terms of D = −id/dx in the form

for a polynomial p in D (which is called the symbol), a pseudo-differential operator has a symbol in a more general class of functions. Often one can reduce a problem in analysis of pseudo-differential operators to a sequence of algebraic problems involving their symbols, and this is the essence of microlocal analysis.

Kernel of pseudo-differential operator

Pseudo-differential operators can be represented by kernels.  The singularity of the kernel on the diagonal depends on the degree of the corresponding operator. In fact, if the symbol satisfies the above differential inequalities with m ≤ 0, it can be shown that the kernel is a singular integral kernel.

See also
 Differential algebra for a definition of pseudo-differential operators in the context of differential algebras and differential rings.
 Fourier transform
 Fourier integral operator
 Oscillatory integral operator
 Sato's fundamental theorem
 Operational calculus

Footnotes

References
 .

Further reading
 Nicolas Lerner,  Metrics on the phase space and non-selfadjoint pseudo-differential operators. Pseudo-Differential Operators. Theory and Applications, 3. Birkhäuser Verlag, Basel, 2010. 
 Michael E. Taylor, Pseudodifferential Operators, Princeton Univ. Press 1981. 
 M. A. Shubin, Pseudodifferential Operators and Spectral Theory, Springer-Verlag 2001. 
 Francois Treves, Introduction to Pseudo Differential and Fourier Integral Operators, (University Series in Mathematics), Plenum Publ. Co. 1981. 
  F. G. Friedlander and M. Joshi, Introduction to the Theory of Distributions, Cambridge University Press 1999. 
 

 André Unterberger, Pseudo-differential operators and applications: an introduction. Lecture Notes Series, 46. Aarhus Universitet, Matematisk Institut, Aarhus, 1976.

External links
 Lectures on Pseudo-differential Operators by Mark S. Joshi on arxiv.org.
 

Differential operators
Microlocal analysis
Functional analysis
Harmonic analysis
Generalized functions
Partial differential equations